Faustine Mussa Baha (born 1981) is a Tanzanian long-distance runner. He represented Tanzania in marathon at the 2012 Summer Olympics in London, finishing in 33rd in a time of 2:17:39.

References

External links

1981 births
Living people
Tanzanian male long-distance runners
Olympic athletes of Tanzania
Athletes (track and field) at the 2012 Summer Olympics